Kokavil transmission tower, often nicknamed Kokavil Tower, is a  tall multi-functional transmission tower at Kokavil, Mullaitivu, Sri Lanka, which is used for  television, radio and telecommunication transmissions as well as military communications. Its mast structure is made of lattice steel.

History 
Kokavil transmission tower was built in 1982 as a part of grant-aid provided by the Government of Japan. It was a guyed mast tower. It provided analog television transmission on VHF band of frequencies to the Northern part of the island beyond Vavuniya.  Kokavil area came under the control of Tamil Tigers in 1990. Before this the Kokavil Tower had been destroyed by the LTTE. However, the Tamil Tigers had utilised the location for their transmissions, including Voice of Tigers using a smaller temporary tower. In 2006, it was bombed and destroyed by Sri Lankan Air Force.

Restoration/New tower 
After the end of civil war, Government of Sri Lanka rebuilt the tower by spending 330 million Sri Lankan Rupees constructing it at a location closer to the original site. Now, the tower provides digital  television transmission (using DVB-T2) and Analog television transmission to the northern part of Sri Lanka.

References 

1982 establishments in Sri Lanka
Buildings and structures in Mullaitivu District
Communication towers in Sri Lanka
Towers completed in 1982